These are the results of the Men's Heavy 91 kg  competition in boxing at the 2010 Summer Youth Olympics in Singapore. Preliminaries were held on August 21, semifinals on August 22, 5th place bout on August 23, the bronze medal bout on August 24 and the Final bout on August 25.
Unlike world championships and the Olympic Games, only one bronze medal is awarded.

Medalists

Results

References
 Draw

Boxing at the 2010 Summer Youth Olympics